Respect Game or Expect Flames is a collaborative studio album by Casual and J. Rawls. It was released on Nature Sounds on August 28, 2012.

Critical reception

Mark Bozzer of Exclaim! wrote, "Smash Rockwell (Casual) weaves in and out of the funk that Rawls provides throughout the full-length, although he stumbles yet again out of the gate on the album opener." He stated that "Respect Game or Expect Flames" and "Hier-O-Dot" are the album's highlights. T. Love of Okayplayer called the album "one of the most consistently dope and balanced albums in 2012," adding that it "is a crowd pleaser regardless of geographic origin and is sure to win both artists new fans on both coasts."

Track listing

Personnel
Credits adapted from liner notes.

 Casual – vocals, executive production, recording
 J. Rawls – production, executive production, recording, mixing
 Pep Love – vocals (1), recording
 Allana Reign – vocals (1, 7)
 Del the Funky Homosapien – vocals (2)
 The Mystery School – vocals (5)
 Copywrite – vocals (9)
 Phesto – vocals (9)
 Tage – vocals (9)
 Tajai – vocals (9)
 Jakki da Motamouth – vocals (9)
 Opio – vocals (9)
 Rene Dion – vocals (11)
 Kurious – vocals (12)
 The Liquid Crystal Project – music (15)
 Devin Horwitz – executive production
 Storm 9000 – mixing, mastering
 Matt Wyatt – artwork

References

External links
 
 

2012 albums
Casual (rapper) albums
Collaborative albums
Nature Sounds albums